Castle Street is a street in Oxford, England. It is named after Oxford Castle which is close by to the west and is located in the St Ebbe's area of southwest central Oxford.

"Castell Streate" can be found on a map of 1578 by Ralph Agas. In 1885, Castle Terrace was built by F. J. Codd in the adjoining Paradise Street. This became Simon House, run by the Cyreneans.

To the north there is a junction with New Road and Queen Street. The Westgate Shopping Centre is to east at the northern end of the street.

Gallery

References

External links
 

Streets in Oxford